The Municipal Hospital is the main hospital in Luxembourg City, in southern Luxembourg.  It is located off the Route d'Arlon N6 road, in Rollingergrund, in the west of the city.  The hospital forms the largest part of the Centre Hospitalier de Luxembourg, the public sector healthcare provider in Luxembourg City.

Opened in 1976 as part of the newly created CHL, the hospital is set on seven floors (including one below ground) and provides all the services of a general hospital.

References

Buildings and structures in Luxembourg City
Hospital buildings completed in 1976
Hospitals in Luxembourg
Hospitals established in 1976
1976 establishments in Luxembourg
Municipal hospitals